The State Assembly elections in India, 2007 took place between 8 February 2007 and 23 February 2007 for Indian States of Goa, Himachal Pradesh, Manipur, Punjab, Uttarakhand and Uttar Pradesh. Elections for Gujarat were held in December 2007.

Results
Counting of votes was done on 27 February 2007 and the results were announced on the same date.

The Indian National Congress, who were the incumbents in Punjab and Uttarakhand lost their majorities in both states.

Goa 

Congress emerge as single largest party after results.
Congress formed government in alliance with NCP and SGF.
SGF later merged in Congress to raise its tally to 18.

Gujarat

Himachal Pradesh

Manipur 
Elections in Manipur were held in three phases on 8 February 14 and 23 February.

The Indian National Congress won by a simple majority. A Congress-led coalition government was sworn in on 1 March 2007 with Okram Ibobi Singh as the Chief Minister.

Punjab 

Elections in Punjab was held on 13 February 2007.

A Shiromani Akali Dal-Bharatiya Janata Party coalition government sworn on 2 March 2007 with Parkash Singh Badal as the Chief Minister.

Uttarakhand 

Elections in Uttarakhand was held on 21 February 2007.

The Bharatiya Janata Party emerged as the largest party with 34 seats in a house of 70. They were still one short of the majority to form a government. After much wrangling it was announced that the Uttarakhand Kranti Dal and the three independents would be supporting the government. Elections to Bajpur are still to take place. The incumbent Indian National Congress Government lost as they had only 21 seats out of 70 seats.

After protracted discussions it was announced the B. C. Khanduri would be Chief Minister and B. S. Koshyari was to manage party work.

Uttar Pradesh 

Elections in Uttar Pradesh were held in seven phases during April and May 2007. In the end, Mayawati's B.S.P won this election.

See also
N. Gopalaswami

References

External links

Election Commission of India – State Elections, 2007
Election Commission of India

2007 elections in India
India
2007 in India
Elections in India by year